Jemma may refer to:
 Jemma (given name), a given name
 Jemma, Bauchi, a town in Bauchi State, Nigeria
 Dorothée Jemma, a French voice actress specializing in dubbing
 Ottavio Jemma, an Italian screenwriter
 Rocco Jemma, an Italian pediatrician

See also
 Jema'a, a local government area in Kaduna State, Nigeria
 Gemma (disambiguation)